Andrew Knox (April 26, 1866 – August 4, 1946) was an Irish-born farmer and political figure in Saskatchewan, Canada. He represented Prince Albert in the House of Commons of Canada from 1917 to 1925. He was elected to Parliament in the 1917 federal election as a Liberal-Unionist supporter of Sir Robert Borden's wartime Union Government. After the war, he crossed the floor to join the new Progressive Party.

He was born in County Londonderry, Ireland, the son of James Knox and the former Miss Boyd, and was educated in Coleraine. Knox came to Canada in 1890 and settled on a farm in Prince Albert, Saskatchewan. In 1900, he married Elizabeth Short. Knox was a director of the Saskatchewan Grain Growers' Association from 1907 to 1918. He served as mayor of Prince Albert from 1915 to 1917. He was a member of the Progressive Party from 1919 on and was re-elected as a Progressive MP in the 1921 federal election. Knox was defeated when he ran for reelection to the House of Commons in 1925 federal election.

References

Members of the House of Commons of Canada from Saskatchewan
Liberal-Unionist MPs in Canada
Progressive Party of Canada MPs
Mayors of Prince Albert, Saskatchewan
1866 births
1946 deaths
20th-century Canadian politicians